John Michael (born 1972 in Aliquippa, Pennsylvania) is an American sports broadcaster, currently serving as the TV play by play announcer for the Cleveland Cavaliers of the National Basketball Association (NBA).  From the 2011-12 to 2018-19 seasons, he served as the team's radio play by play announcer.

Early life and education
Michael attended high school at Sewickley Academy. He graduated from the University of Notre Dame with degrees in mechanical engineering, law and business administration. After earning his J.D. degree, he worked as a trial lawyer for five years in construction law for K & L Gates.

Career
Following his law career Michael switched careers, and went into the sports announcing field. First as a baseball announcer, he served as the play-by-play announcer for the Hagerstown Suns and then as an ice hockey announcer in Johnstown for the East Coast Hockey League and then the Lake Erie Monsters and in 2009 was hired by Fox Sports Ohio as the pregame host for Columbus Blue Jackets telecasts. In October, 2011 he was chosen out of a pool of 200 applicants to become the new radio play-by-play announcer for the Cleveland Cavaliers. In September 2019, he was moved to the TV play-by-play position following the death of longtime team announcer Fred McLeod.

Personal life
Michael is married to Julie Maund. They met while attending college at Notre Dame.

References

National Basketball Association broadcasters
People from Aliquippa, Pennsylvania
Living people
National Hockey League broadcasters
Minor League Baseball broadcasters
American Hockey League broadcasters
1972 births
University of Notre Dame alumni
Cleveland Cavaliers announcers